Sir Henry Cocke (1538 – 24 March 1610), of Broxbourne, Hertfordshire, was an English politician.

He was the eldest son of John Cock, the Master of Requests, 1550–1552 and educated at St. John’s College, Cambridge (Easter 1553) and the Inner Temple (1559).

He was a Justice of the Peace for Hertfordshire from 1569 and was appointed High Sheriff of Hertfordshire for 1574–75. From 1597 to 1610 he served as Cofferer of the Household, a senior position in the English Royal Household. Cocke was paid £5,000 for the expenses of Prince Henry in the year 1607 to 1608.

He was elected a Member (MP) of the Parliament of England for Downton in 1571, St. Albans in 1572, and Hertfordshire in 1584, 1586 and 1593. He was knighted in 1577. He served as a deputy lieutenant for the county from 1575.

He married Ursula, the daughter and coheiress of James Bury of Hampton Poyle, Oxfordshire and had one son, who predeceased him, and 2 daughters.

References

1538 births
1610 deaths
People from Broxbourne
Alumni of St John's College, Cambridge
Members of the Inner Temple
Members of the Parliament of England for Hertfordshire
English MPs 1571
English MPs 1572–1583
English MPs 1584–1585
English MPs 1586–1587
English MPs 1593
High Sheriffs of Hertfordshire
Deputy Lieutenants of Hertfordshire